The National Basketball League Cup, often shortened to the NBL Cup is an annual cup competition for the Australian National Basketball League (NBL).

History

On 21 December 2020 the Australian National Basketball League established the first NBL Cup to be held in Melbourne, Victoria. All nine NBL teams will take part in this tournament from 20 February to 14 March as part of a month-long basketball extravaganza. All 36 games will be mostly played at John Cain Arena (formerly Melbourne Arena) and some other games to be played at the State Basketball Centre in Wantirna South, Melbourne.

The 36 games will count towards the 2020–21 NBL season and, in a first for the league, will also decide the winner of the inaugural NBL Cup with total prize money of $300,000. Every team will play each other once and the team with the most points at the end of the 36 games will be awarded the NBL Cup and $150,000 in prize money. If teams finish equal on points, then the team with the most wins will be declared the winner. The runner-up will receive $100,000 and third place $50,000.

All nine NBL teams will move to the Melbourne Hub to contest the 2021 NBL Cup. The NBL's intention, subject to COVID and scheduling issues, is for teams to host their customary 14 home games during the regular season, over and above the games played in the NBL Melbourne Hub.

The only planned exception will be the New Zealand Breakers, who will start their season in Australia and hopefully return to New Zealand as soon as borders allow for home and away games.

All 36 games played in the NBL Melbourne Hub will count towards the teams’ overall season record in accordance with standard ladder methodology. In addition, teams will compete for the NBL Cup, with three points awarded for a win and an extra point awarded for each quarter won and half a point with even quarters across the 36 games held.

At the completion of the NBL Melbourne Hub, clubs will return to their respective home venues and complete the remainder of the home and away regular season.

On 14 March 2021 the Perth Wildcats won the inaugural 2021 NBL Cup with a 7–1 record in eight games played. Bryce Cotton led all scorers with 26.9 points and teammate John Mooney led all rebounds with 12.3 per game. Adelaide 36ers rookie Josh Giddey led all assists with 7.4 per game.

In the 2021–22 season, the NBL returned to their normal format of 28 games with no midseason tournament.

Format
Every team in this tournament will play each other once (8 games each). The team with the most points at the end of this tournament will win the NBL Cup. All teams can get 3 points for a win, 1 point for each quarter won and for even quarters only half a point.

If teams have the same number of points at the end of this tournament, then the team with the most number of wins would be the winner. If multiple teams have the same number of wins then the best points For and Against would be declared the winner. If the teams have the same plus minus record then the team with the most points For will be declared the winner.

The NBL Cup will be presented to the winning team at the conclusion of this tournament.

Finals

Titles by team

See also

 Basketball in Australia
 Basketball in New Zealand
 National Basketball League

References

External links 
 
 Basketball Australia official website
 Fox Sports Australia Basketball Section

 
Fox Sports (Australian TV network)
Basketball leagues in Australia
Basketball leagues in New Zealand
Professional sports leagues in Australia
Professional sports leagues in New Zealand
Sports leagues established in 2020